Fengqing County is located in Lincang City, Yunnan province, China. During the Ming Dynasty it was a frontier known as Shunning Prefecture.

Administrative divisions
Fengqing County has 8 towns, 2 townships and 3 ethnic townships. 
8 towns

2 townships
 Shili
 Dasi
3 ethnic townships
 Xinhua Yi and Miao
 Yaojie Yi
 Guodazhai Yi and Bai

Ethnic groups
The Fengqing County Gazetteer (1993) lists the following ethnic groups.

Miao: 3,501 persons (1990)
Green Miao 青苗 / Mengsa 蒙撒 / Mengzhua 蒙爪
White Miao 白苗 / Mengdou 蒙豆 / Mengchu 蒙处 / Baijia 白家
Flowery Miao 花苗 / Mengzai 蒙栽
Bulang 1,276 persons (1990); autonyms: Benren 本人, Laobenren 老本人
Dalise 大立色, Pingzhang 平掌, Qiongying 琼英 of Guodazhai Township 郭大寨乡
Shantoutian Village 山头田村, Sanchahe Township 三岔河乡
Wa: 837 persons (1990)
Anjie 安街村, Mengzuo 勐佐乡
Xintian 新田, Xinzhai 新寨, Alihou 阿里侯 of Desili Township 德思里乡
Lahu: 387 persons (1990)
Hongxing 红星, Qingkou 箐口, Xianfeng 先锋, Bianfudong 蝙蝠洞
Xinmin Village 新民村, Xueshan Township 雪山乡

Climate

References

External links
Fengqing County Official Site
Further information

County-level divisions of Lincang